Nicolas Gobet (born 28 December 1938) is a Swiss rower. He competed at the 1964 Summer Olympics and the 1968 Summer Olympics.

References

1938 births
Living people
Swiss male rowers
Olympic rowers of Switzerland
Rowers at the 1964 Summer Olympics
Rowers at the 1968 Summer Olympics